The 2021–22 Big Bash League season or BBL|11 was the eleventh season of the Big Bash League, the professional men's Twenty20 domestic cricket competition in Australia. The tournament was played from 5 December 2021 and finished on 28 January 2022. The Perth Scorchers defeated the defending champions Sydney Sixers by 79 runs in the final to claim their fourth title.

Background
On 8 November 2021, Cricket Australia (CA) confirmed that the inaugural BBL First Nations round would be played between January 8 and 14, 2022. The matches were played at the venues in Adelaide, with the players of all teams wearing Indigenous kits designed by Aboriginal and Torres Strait Islanders artists, which are portraying unique stories. The round was played intending to mark the tournament's commitment to deepening education and meaningful connection with Indigenous People of Australia.

On 30 December 2021, the 27th match of the regular season between Perth Scorchers and Melbourne Stars was postponed, following a COVID-19 positive case in the Stars' camp. On 5 January 2022, the 36th match of the regular season between Brisbane Heat and Sydney Sixers was postponed, following COVID-19 positive cases in the Heat's camp.
The 39th match of the regular season between Adelaide Strikers and Melbourne Stars was also postponed.

Teams

Summary

Visa contracted players 

Maximum of 3 visa players permitted in the matchday squad.

INJ Player withdrawn due to injury 
INT Player withdrawn due to international duties 
PER Player withdrawn for personal reasons and other commitments

Venues
Fourteen venues have been selected to be used for the tournament, including the return of Geelong and Coffs Harbour, while a BBL match was played at the Junction Oval in Melbourne for the first time. Out of Perth Scorchers' seven scheduled home matches, only one match against Brisbane Heat was played at Perth Stadium, with all the other matches were shifted to different venues.

Note: Venues of the matches will be changed at any time by border closures restrictions due to COVID-19 pandemic.

Pre-season

Regular season

League table

Summary of results
A summary of results for each team's fourteen regular season matches, plus finals where applicable, in chronological order. A team's opponent for any given match is listed above the margin of victory or defeat.

Last updated: 28 January 2022

Matches
On 14 July 2021, Cricket Australia confirmed the full schedule for the tournament. 45 of the 61 games – including all of the finals – will be shown on Channel Seven, while Fox Cricket and Kayo Sports will broadcast all of the matches.

Week 1

Week 2

Week 3

Week 4

Week 5

Week 6

Week 7

Play-offs

Bracket

Matches

Notes

References

External links
 Official website
Series home at ESPN Cricinfo

Big Bash League seasons
Big Bash League
Big Bash League